The Federation of Energy, Fashion, Chemistry and Related Workers (FEMCA) is a trade union representing industrial workers in Italy.

The union was founded in 2001, when the Federation of Energy, Resource, Chemical and Related Workers merged with the Italian Federation of Textile and Clothing Workers.  Like both its predecessors, the union affiliated to the Italian Confederation of Workers' Trade Unions.  On founding, the union had about 160,000 members, and was led by Renzo Bellini.  In 2017, Nora Garofalo became the first woman to lead the union.

General Secretaries
2001: Renzo Bellini
2000s: Sergio Gigli
2015: Angelo Colombini
2017: Nora Garofalo

External links

References

Chemical industry in Italy
Manufacturing trade unions
Trade unions established in 2001
Trade unions in Italy